Harold Heiland (April 26, 1890 – April 18, 1963) was an American sprinter. He competed in the men's 100 metres at the 1912 Summer Olympics.

References

1890 births
1963 deaths
Athletes (track and field) at the 1912 Summer Olympics
American male sprinters
Olympic track and field athletes of the United States
People from Ilion, New York